The United States's Niblick nuclear test series was a group of 41 nuclear tests conducted in 1963–1964. These tests  followed the Operation Roller Coaster series and preceded the Operation Whetstone series.

List of the nuclear tests

References

Explosions in 1963
Explosions in 1964
Niblick
1963 in military history
1964 in military history
1963 in Nevada
1964 in Nevada